Telas is the fourth studio album by American musician Nicolás Jaar. It was released on July 17, 2020, by Other People.

Critical reception

In a review for Pitchfork, Daniel Felsenthal said, "Telas is a taut, exhaustively balanced work, although its four long songs add up to an hour of music. In the context of Jaar’s busy year, it signifies a continued blurring of his various roles—DJ, ambient craftsman, distinctive vocalist with an electronic toolkit—and the album’s deliberate structure and ominous mood indicate that Jaar can make direct, even political statements without sung lyrics or speech samples." John Amen of Exclaim! said "Telas brings to mind nascent stars and galaxies, protean adaptations, and ever-expanding space. The album's complex design and diverse instrumentation are consistently sublime, the venture no less than a musical inquiry into the attributes of being itself."

Track listing
All tracks are written by Nicolas Jaar.

Album art
The album art was created by Somnath Bhatt and the website was built by Abeera Kamran.

References

2020 albums
Nicolas Jaar albums